Giulia Salemi (born 1 April 1993 in Piacenza, Emilia-Romagna) is an Italian model, actress and television presenter.

Early life and career
She was born in Piacenza to the policeman Mario Salemi and the Iranian beautician Fariba Tehrani, who separated in 2009. She studied at the high school of human sciences and attended Economics at the Università Cattolica del Sacro Cuore, in the Piacenza branch. She was attracted from a very young age to the world of entertainment, she made her debut as a model. She embarked on a television career, she leaves her studies after a year.

The first television participation takes place in the summer of 2012, in which she participates in the fourth edition of the Veline television program. The following year she takes part as a competitor, winning it, in the reality show of La5 Sweet Sardinia. On September 14, 2014 she participates in the final of Miss Italia, where she is classified in third place and gets the national bands of Miss Sport Lotto and Miss TV Sorrisi e Canzoni. In February 2015 she joined Simona Ventura in the conduct of the football talent show Leyton Orient, broadcast on Agon Channel. In the same year she participates as a competitor paired with her mother Fariba in the fourth edition of Pechino Express, finishing in third place.

Private life
The former model dated the model Francesco Monte, met during the participation in the third edition of the reality show Grande Fratello VIP: the two broke off the relationship in the summer of 2019. From December of 2020, a sentimental story began with the model and ex velino of Striscia la notizia Pierpaolo Pretelli always inside the house of Big Brother VIP, during the fifth edition.

Filmography

Films

Television

References

External links

1993 births
Living people
People from Piacenza
Italian people of Iranian descent
Italian television actresses
Italian film actresses
20th-century Italian actresses
21st-century Italian actresses
Italian radio presenters
Italian television presenters
Italian women radio presenters
Italian women television presenters
People from Emilia-Romagna
Italian female models